Xenomigia involuta is a moth of the family Notodontidae. It is endemic
to cloud forests on the western slope of the Ecuadorian Andes.

The length of the forewings is 14.5–16 mm for males and 16–17.5 mm for females. The ground color of the forewings is chocolate brown, while the ground color of the hindwings is creamy white.

Etymology
The name is derived from the Latin word involuta (meaning intricate or complex) and refers to the forewing pattern of this species. The complex appearance is derived from the contrasting markings. Most other Xenomigia species show more subdued patterns.

References

Moths described in 2008
Notodontidae of South America